PT Indonesia AirAsia, operating as Indonesia AirAsia, is a low-cost airline based in Tangerang, Indonesia. It operates scheduled domestic and international services and is an Indonesian associate carrier of Malaysian low-fare airline, AirAsia. Its main base is Soekarno–Hatta International Airport in Jakarta. Indonesia AirAsia is listed in category 1 by the Indonesian Civil Aviation Authority for airline safety quality.

History

Awair (1999-2005) 
The airline was established as Awair (Air Wagon International) in 1999 by Abdurrahman Wahid, who was chairman of Nahdlatul Ulama, the largest Muslim organisation in Indonesia. Wahid had a 40% stake in the airline which he relinquished after being elected president of Indonesia in late October 1999. The airline started operations on 22 June 2000 with Airbus A300, A310 and A320 aircraft, but all flights were suspended in March 2002. Awair restarted operating domestically within Indonesia as an associate of AirAsia in January 2005.

Indonesia AirAsia 
On 1 December 2005, Awair changed its name to Indonesia AirAsia in line with other AirAsia branded airlines in the region. AirAsia Berhad has a 49% share in the airline with Fersindo Nusaperkasa owning 51%. Indonesia's laws disallow majority foreign ownership on domestic civil aviation operations.

The airline, along with many others in Indonesia, was previously banned from flying to the EU. However, its ban was lifted in July 2010, together with Batavia Air. In 2011, the company appointed CIMB Securities Indonesia and Credit Suisse Securities Indonesia as joint-lead underwriters for the 20 percent IPO in the fourth quarter of that year.

Batavia Air acquisition (2012-2013) 

A buy out of Batavia Air was announced on 26 July 2012, that was to be done in two stages; AirAsia would buy 76.95% shares from Metro Batavia in a partnership with Fersindo Nusaperkasa (Indonesia AirAsia). Following that, by 2013, AirAsia was to acquire the remaining 23.05% held by other shareholders. The acquisition of Batavia Air by AirAsia Berhad and Fersindo created some controversy with Indonesian regulators at the time, concerned that Batavia would be majority-owned by a non-Indonesian entity.

By 11 October 2012 the deal between AirAsia Berhad, Fersindo Nusaperkasa (Indonesia AirAsia) and PT Metro Batavia had been dropped, citing high risks associated with the ailing airline.

When the cancellation of the planned takeover between Batavia and AirAsia was announced on 11 October 2012, a joint statement was issued announcing a plan to proceed with an alliance encompassing ground handling, distribution and inventory systems in Indonesia. The statement also announced a plan to deliver operational alliances between Batavia and the AirAsia group.

Batavia and Indonesia AirAsia announced a plan to form a separate joint venture to provide a regional pilot training centre in Indonesia. No details were provided on that new alliance when it was announced in early October 2012.

On 15 February 2012, the airline confirmed that it no longer had intentions to buy Batavia Air, following PT Metro Batavia's bankruptcy announcement on 30 January 2012.

Indonesia AirAsia X (2015) 

In January 2015, the airline launched a long haul subsidiary named Indonesia AirAsia X, in a joint venture with its Malaysian counterpart, AirAsia X. The Indonesia AirAsia subsidiary became the country's first long haul low-cost carrier and was based at Ngurah Rai Airport in Denpasar, Bali. It flew its maiden flight on 30 January of that year with a flight from Denpasar to Taipei with an Airbus A330-300.

On 28 June 2016, Indonesia AirAsia launched the Auto Bag Drop facility at Ngurah Rai International Airport. On 12 August 2016, AirAsia Indonesia moved its flight operations from Terminal 3 to Terminal 2 at Soekarno–Hatta International Airport in preparation of the opening of the main section of Terminal 3. The airline later consolidated its flight operations at Terminal 2 on 12 December 2018, following the full opening of the Garuda Indonesia-occupied Terminal 3.

On 2 May 2019, AirAsia Indonesia inaugurates Lombok as its fifth hub in Indonesia in addition to its existing hubs in Soekarno-Hatta International Airport, Ngurah Rai International Airport, Kuala Namu International Airport and Juanda International Airport.

COVID-19 Pandemic (2020-2022) 
In March 2020, its long haul subsidiary, Indonesia AirAsia X, ceased flights due to the effects of the COVID-19 pandemic. The long haul arm later announced its permanent closure in October 2022, following restructuring plans of the AirAsia Group.

In July 2021, the company announced that it will temporarily stop all flights for a month from 6 July 2021 to support the government's effort to limit a spike in COVID-19 cases. The airline later resumed operations on October 2, 2021 following a two month suspension of flights,. 

In January 2022, Indonesia AirAsia announced the resumption of all remaining routes that were suspended from July 2022. In April 2022, the airline again announced a terminal change at Soekarno Hatta International Airport, thereby splitting its operations between Terminal 1 for domestic flights and Terminal 3 for international flights.

In February 2023, the airline announced the reactivation of its remaining eight parked aircraft from its fleet of 25 Airbus A320-200s, with a plan to acquire eight further Airbus A320s. Furthermore, the airline stated its intentions to resume long haul service to Japan and South Korea, as well as introduce new services to China and India with the acquisition of Airbus A330-900neo aircraft from Thai AirAsia in 2023.

Corporate affairs 
The airline's head office is in Tangerang, adjacent to Soekarno-Hatta International Airport. It has the AirAsia logo on its roof and uses natural lighting. As of 2013 over 2,000 employees work there. Prior to the building's 2013 opening, the airline's employees worked in several offices in Jakarta. They were divided between Terminal 1A of Soekarno-Hatta Airport, Soewarna, and Menara Batavia.

Destinations 

As of October 2019, Indonesia AirAsia serves the following destinations:

Fleet

Current fleet

, the Indonesia AirAsia fleet consists of the following aircraft:

Former fleet
The airline previously operated the following aircraft:
 1 Airbus A300-600 as Awair
 3 Airbus A310-300 as Awair
 12 Boeing 737-300

Special liveries

Incidents and accidents

On 28 December 2014, Indonesia AirAsia Flight 8501, an Airbus A320-216 registered PK-AXC (MSN 3648) with 155 passengers and seven crew on board, crashed into the Java Sea whilst en route from Juanda International Airport, Surabaya to Changi International Airport, Singapore, killing all 162 on board. Regulatory licenses for the Surabaya-Singapore route as well as Medan-Palembang route have been suspended for Indonesia AirAsia since January 2015 due to suspected licensing breaches; however, the Medan-Palembang route has been resumed.

See also 
 Philippines AirAsia
 AirAsia X
 Thai AirAsia
 Indonesia AirAsia X
 Aviation in Indonesia

References

External links 

 Indonesia AirAsia fleet age
 Indonesia AirAsia fleet detail

Airlines of Indonesia
Airlines established in 2004
Airlines formerly banned in the European Union
Low-cost carriers
AirAsia
Indonesian companies established in 2004
Companies based in Tangerang